Ananthura may refer to:
 Ananthura  (isopod), a genus of isopods in the family Antheluridae
 Ananthura (plant), a genus of plants in the family Asteraceae